The 34th Street Crosstown Line is a surface transit line on 34th Street in Manhattan, New York City, United States. It currently hosts the M34/M34A Select Bus Service routes of MTA's Regional Bus Operations. The M34 runs from 12th Avenue to FDR Drive via 34th Street, while the M34A runs from Port Authority Bus Terminal to Waterside Plaza.

Route
For most of its length, the M34 uses 34th Street to travel crosstown. There is a one-block stretch of the westbound route, between 11th and 12th Avenues, that runs along 33rd Street; this is because the M34 needs to terminate along the northbound West Side Highway. At its eastern end, the M34 turns north onto the service road under FDR Drive to terminate at the East 34th Street Ferry Landing, which requires the M34 to make a U-turn at 35th Street and down southbound FDR Drive for one block.

The M34A uses a different route than the M34 at its western and eastern ends. It travels along Eighth Avenue northbound and Ninth Avenue southbound between 34th Street and 43rd Street (using 43rd Street to terminate westbound), thereby serving the Port Authority Bus Terminal. It also uses Second Avenue southbound and the FDR Drive service road northbound between 23rd Street and 34th Street in order to serve its Waterside Plaza terminus as well as Peter Cooper Village. The eastbound segment of the M34A between Second Avenue and FDR Drive uses 23rd Street.

Stops

History

Streetcar line
The Thirty-Fourth Street Crosstown Railway was chartered on March 18, 1896, being a consolidation of the Thirty-Fourth Street Railroad Company and the Thirty-Fourth Street Ferry & Eleventh Avenue Railroad. The stock of the company was owned by the Metropolitan Street Railway. The streetcar line was previously a horsecar line, and in July 1900 the line began running via storage batteries, but in September 1903 it was changed to using an underground third rail.

Local bus service
New York City Omnibus Corporation bus route (M19 - 16) replaced New York Railways' 34th Street Crosstown Line streetcar on April 1, 1936.

In April 1986, the main bus route was renamed the M34.

In 2010, it was one of seven local bus routes in Manhattan to participate in a PayPass smart card program. This program was a pilot program meant to find a suitable smart card technology to replace the MetroCard.

In August 2010, a program was implemented along the M16 and M34 routes, in which riders could track arriving buses. This later became MTA Bus Time.

Select Bus Service

The M34 SBS and M34A SBS routes began on November 13, 2011. Like other Select Bus Service corridors, off-board fare payment is used, as well as all-door boarding. These are considered by the MTA as two SBS services, the M34 34th Street Crosstown and the former M16 route, which was renamed the M34A; the routes share a single corridor. The stops are listed below from west to east. Red-painted bus lanes were installed on 34th Street between First Avenue and Eleventh Avenue. The stops at Madison Avenue and Lexington Avenue were eliminated, the westbound stop at Tenth Avenue was moved to Dyer Avenue, and a stop at West 43rd Street near Ninth Avenue was moved consolidated with a stop at 42nd Street near that avenue. A part-time stop at West 38th Street and Ninth Avenue was moved to West 39th Street.

On April 8, 2012, as part of a pilot program that expanded on the 2010 pilot, MTA Bus Time was phased into this route. In April 2012, weekend service on the route was increased.

Starting in early 2013, bus bulbs were installed at twelve locations along 34th Street, allowing buses to stay in the bus lane while stopping. In November 2015, the section between Lexington Avenue and Seventh Avenue was completed with the installation of four new bus bulbs, resurfaced streets, new parking spaces, and newly painted bus lanes. The portion between 12th Avenue and Lexington Avenue included the construction of eight bus bulbs at bus stops and one curb extension. The remaining segment, between Lexington Avenue and the FDR Drive Service Road is expected to be completed by December 2016. The remaining portion would install three bus bulbs at bus stops and would build two curb extensions. The entire cost of the project is $27 million. In its first year of operation, there has been 23% time savings. Since 2011, there has been 12% ridership growth on the route, while overall, bus ridership has been decreasing in Manhattan.

References

External links

MTA Regional Bus routes
034